Carlos Manuel da Silva Freire (born 18 April 1959 in Sintra, Lisbon) is a Portuguese retired footballer who played as a forward.

External links

1959 births
Living people
People from Sintra
Portuguese footballers
Association football forwards
Primeira Liga players
Liga Portugal 2 players
Segunda Divisão players
Sporting CP footballers
Vitória F.C. players
Portimonense S.C. players
S.C. Beira-Mar players
G.D. Estoril Praia players
S.U. Sintrense players
Segunda División players
RC Celta de Vigo players
Portugal youth international footballers
Portugal under-21 international footballers
Portugal international footballers
Portuguese expatriate footballers
Expatriate footballers in Spain
Sportspeople from Lisbon District